Chaeremon or Cherimon was an Egyptian Christian monk who lived around the 4th and 5th centuries in the Nitrian Desert of Lower Egypt. He was one of the Desert Fathers.

Chaeremon was an ascetic who lived in a cave. His cell was 40 stadia from the main church in Nitria and 12 stadia away from the main water supply.

He is canonized as a saint in the Eastern Orthodox tradition.

References

4th-century births
5th-century deaths
Ascetics
Egyptian Christian monks
Saints from Roman Egypt
Eastern Catholic saints
Coptic Orthodox saints
Desert Fathers
Egyptian hermits